Gonzales Unified School District is a school district in Gonzales, California. It operates La Gloria Elementary School, Fairview Middle School, Gonzales High School, and Gonzales Adult School.

History

In 2018 Yvette Irving became the superintendent. The school board continued her tenure in 2020, with an anticipated end in mid-2022. In March 2022 the school board decided to remove her early before the scheduled end of her term. Three board members did so in favor, and two voted against the removal. The school district paid Irving's remaining scheduled contracted earnings as the district did not specify wrongdoing as a reason for the firing.

References

External links
 

School districts in Monterey County, California